Plataraea elegans is a species of rove beetles. It is found in Europe.

References 

Aleocharinae
Beetles described in 1934